Dukhai is a Bangladeshi film written and directed by Morshedul Islam. The film got National Film Awards in 9 different categories.

Plot
This film shows the struggle of the people of the shore in the natural calamity.

Cast
 Raisul Islam Asad
 Rokeya Prachy
 Mehbooba Mahnoor Chandni
 Nazma Anwar
 Amirul Haq Chowdhury
 Nishi

Soundtrack
The music of this film was directed by Pulak Gupta.

Awards

References

1997 films
Bengali-language Bangladeshi films
1990s Bengali-language films
Films directed by Morshedul Islam
Best Film Bachsas Award winners
Best Film National Film Award (Bangladesh) winners
Films whose writer won the Best Screenplay National Film Award (Bangladesh)